Angueira is a former civil parish in the municipality (concelho) of Vimioso, continental Portugal. In 2013, the parish merged into the new parish Caçarelhos e Angueira. The population in 2011 was 116, in an area of 22.18 km². It is situated near the north-west corner of the district of Bragança.

History
Until 1853, Angueira was part of the extinct municipality of Outeiro.

This early history is marked by a community of several chapels, the one to São Miguel, as legend suggests, was founded by a former general, who turned hermit (and was later buried at the door of the temple).

Geography

Angueira is located near the Portuguese frontier with Spain, in the northwest corner of the municipality of Vimioso, bordered in the north by the parishes of Avelanoso, west by Vale de Frades, south by Caçarelhos, and east by the municipality of Miranda do Douro. The parish is connected with its neighbours by main roads that intersect in the village, and link it to São Joanico, Caçarelhos, Avelanoso and Spain, by the asphalted Três Marras roadway. Crossed by the river of the same name, the main settlement of Angueira is located in the centre of this parish, occupying a small portion in pasturelands and forests, on the right margin of the Angueira River, in a shallow valley. The river is Angueira's ex-libris central attraction, a meandering course that bisects the parish, yet attracts locals and tourists throughout the year.

Economy
A rural community, the residents are primarily involved in agricultural activities (supporting the raising of cattle, sheep and goats, owing to the rich pasturelands), although commercial businesses are located in the centre. Included in these activities is apiculture, fishing (mainly threadfin) and civil construction, in addition to hunting. The local Associação de Caçadores has promoted hunting in this region; known for its natural ecosystem that supports rabbit, partridge and quail, the Association, has in the past helped stock species for game hunting. At one time the waters of the Angueira River were popular destinations for fisherman hoping to catch abundant langoustine, principally from Spain.

Architecture

Civic
 Fountain of Pio

Religious
 Chapel of Santo Cristo
 Chapel of São Sebastião
 Chapel of São Miguel
 Church of São Cipriano
In addition to the religious architecture, Angueira still preserves examples of the castro culture, which at one time supported the Moors, or pre-dates their period. In addition, springs, such as the Fonte Santa, known for local healing properties or "miracles" that may have occurred from the fresh waters. The local government has gone so far as to requalify the area around Fonta Santa, in order to attract further eco-friendly investments in the area. Related to these changes has also been the attempted preservation of local grist mills; yet, issues associated with local property rights have made attempts for full conservation complicated.

Culture
Much like other villages in the Trás-os-Montas, Agueira is richly associated with festival, both religious and secular. Celebrations mark Christmas, the Epiphany, Carnival, Easter and traditional Dia do folar (first Monday of Easter), All Saints Day and summer festival.

References

Former parishes of Portugal
Freguesias of Vimioso